The Udine Half Marathon is an annual road running event over the half marathon distance (21.1 km/13.1 mi) which takes place in late September in Udine, Italy.

The competition is organised by the Associazione Maratonina Udinese and was first held in 2000. It combines a mass race with elite level international participants. Around 1500 runners competed at the 2012 event and this grew to 2162 people the following year. In addition to the main half marathon, there a number of other events held during the race weekend including separate divisions for handbikes and jogging strollers, a non-competitive 7-kilometre (4.3-mile) run called the STRAUdine, and nordic walking.

The course for the race was used for the 2007 IAAF World Road Running Championships. This tournament produced the fastest men's and women's times for the half marathon ever run on Italian soil (58:59 minutes by Zersenay Tadese and 1:06:25 by Lornah Kiplagat).

The course record holders are Geoffrey Mutai in the men's section (59:06 minutes) and Margaret Okayo in the women's section (1:07:23 hours). Kenyan runners have dominated the elite race since its inauguration. All the men's winners have been from Kenya and Kenyan women have topped the podium on all but four occasions. Margaret Okayo won the competition three times in its first four years and Hungary's Anikó Kálovics has since matched that feat.

Past winners

Key:

References

List of winners
Albo d'Oro. Maratonina Udine (archived). Retrieved on 2013-10-05.

External links
Official website

Half marathons
Athletics competitions in Italy
Recurring sporting events established in 2000
Sport in Udine
September sporting events
Autumn events in Italy